Alain Ferrat Mancera (born 13 November 1973) is a Mexican politician from the Ecologist Green Party of Mexico. From 2008 to 2009 he served as Deputo of the LX Legislature of the Mexican Congress representing Veracruz.

References

1973 births
Living people
Politicians from Veracruz
Ecologist Green Party of Mexico politicians
21st-century Mexican politicians
Deputies of the LX Legislature of Mexico
Members of the Chamber of Deputies (Mexico) for Veracruz